Dr. Daggubati Venkateswara Rao, M.B.,B.S., (born 14 December 1953) is a former member of the Indian National Congress.

Personal life 
Rao is the 2nd son-in-law in order for N. T. Rama Rao, actor and founder of the Telugu Desam Party (TDP). He is the son of Daggubati Chenchu Ramaiah. He married politician Daggubati Purandareswari on 9 May 1979. The couple have two children, Nivedita and Hitesh Chenchuram, a daughter and a son respectively.

Career 
Rao is an ex-Minister, ex-Member of Parliament and an ex-Member of the Andhra Pradesh Legislative Assembly representing Parchur constituency in Prakasham District up to 2014. He won the 2009 General Election by getting 73,691 votes and a majority of 2,776 votes. Rao was elected to the State Assembly in 1983, 1985, 1989, 2004, 2009 and to Lok Sabha (Indian lower house) in 1991–1996, and to the Rajya Sabha (Indian Upper House) in 1996. He was an independent member in the 2014 elections but in 2019 he joined the YSR Congress Party. He contested the 2019 Legislative Assembly elections from Parchur Assembly Constituency, Prakasham district. He was defeated by TDP candidate Eluri Sambasiva Rao with a narrow margin.

References

Telugu Desam Party politicians
1953 births
Living people
India MPs 1991–1996
India MPs 2004–2009
People from Prakasam district
Rajya Sabha members from Andhra Pradesh
Lok Sabha members from Andhra Pradesh
Bharatiya Janata Party politicians from Andhra Pradesh
Indian National Congress politicians from Andhra Pradesh
Andhra Pradesh MLAs 1983–1985
Andhra Pradesh MLAs 1985–1989
Andhra Pradesh MLAs 1989–1994
YSR Congress Party politicians